Long Lake is an  lake between the towns of Naples, Maine, Bridgton, Maine and Harrison, Maine. It is connected to Brandy Pond through the Chute River. Long Lake was created by receding glaciers, and has many coves and rocks.

Canal boats from Portland harbor reached Long Lake through the Cumberland and Oxford Canal, completed in 1832. The canal's Songo Lock facilities still control Long Lake water level. Each November, Long Lake is drained by about  so that melting snow does not cause a flood in the spring. The lake is the site of many summer camps, including Camp Newfound, Camp Owatonna, Camp Takajo, and Camp Wildwood (actually located on nearby Wood's Pond).

The famous author, E.B. White, owned a vacation house on Long Lake in the North Bridgton section. Long Lake is the home of fictional character David Drayton in Stephen King's 1980 novella, The Mist, which was made into a 2007 movie, The Mist. Long Lake is the story's opening setting, as well as origin of the mysterious mist.

Long Lake is home to many species of wildlife, which given the growing use of the lake for recreational purposes must be respected.  Most notably, loons which can be heard at night and whose song is sought by so many visitors.  Loon nests can be seen on the shoreline but must never be disturbed.  Visitors to the lake should be cautious around these nests and should avoid any disturbance, including noise.  Boaters should also take extra caution to be watchful of loons on the lake and avoid creating large wakes close by.

Boaters should also inspect their crafts before entering the lake for millfoil, a growing problem in New England lakes.

See also
Songo River Queen II

References

External links
 Long Lake Survey Maine Department of Fisheries and Wildlife

Lakes of Cumberland County, Maine
Naples, Maine
Bridgton, Maine
Harrison, Maine
Lakes of Maine